Salineiro is a village in the southern part of the island of Santiago, Cape Verde. It is part of the municipality of Ribeira Grande de Santiago. In 2010 its population was 1,113. It is located on the western edge of the Ribeira Grande gorge, 2.5 km north of Cidade Velha and 11 km west of the capital Praia.

References

Villages and settlements in Santiago, Cape Verde
Ribeira Grande de Santiago